The Dark Tower: The Gunslinger - So Fell Lord Perth is a one-shot comic book (one-issue limited series) published by Marvel Comics. It is the fourth non-sequential comic book limited series based on Stephen King's The Dark Tower series of novels. It is plotted by Robin Furth, scripted by Peter David, and illustrated by Richard Isanove. Stephen King is the Creative and Executive Director of the project. The issue was published on August 7, 2013.

Its story, featuring the fictitious legend of Arthur Eld and his battle against the towering Lord Perth, mirrors the biblical account of David and Goliath.

Publication dates
Issue #1: August 7, 2013

Collected editions
Along with the two-issue runs of The Dark Tower: The Gunslinger - Sheemie's Tale and The Dark Tower: The Gunslinger - Evil Ground, the single-issue release of So Fell Lord Perth was included in a collected paperback edition entitled The Dark Tower: The Gunslinger - Last Shots and released by Marvel on October 8, 2013. The issue was also included in the hardcover release of The Dark Tower: The Gunslinger Omnibus on September 3, 2014.

See also
The Dark Tower (comics)

References

External links

Dark Tower Official Site

2013 comics debuts
Gunslinger - So Fell Lord Perth, The